"Trust" is a KMFDM song from their 1995 album Nihil which originally appeared as a remix on the "Glory" single in 1994. The remixed version of the song was also included on the Wax Trax! compilation album, Afterburn: '94 and Beyond. Both versions of the song appeared on the German-only Trust/Juke Joint Jezebel release, which came out after the album and used a red version of the "Brute" single cover art. In 2009, a 7" version was released that also contained both mixes.

Track listings

"Trust/Juke Joint Jezebel" (1995) track listing

"Trust" 7" (2009) track listing

References

1995 singles
KMFDM songs
TVT Records singles
Songs written by Sascha Konietzko
1995 songs
Songs written by Günter Schulz